My Two Dads is an American sitcom television series that was produced by Michael Jacobs Productions in association with Tri-Star Television (later Columbia Pictures Television) and distributed by TeleVentures. It starred Paul Reiser, Greg Evigan, and Staci Keanan. The series premiered on NBC on September 20, 1987, airing three seasons through April 30, 1990.

Synopsis

The series begins after Marcy Bradford (only seen in the second-season episode "In Her Dreams"), the mother of 12-year-old Nicole Bradford, has died. The two men who had competed for Marcy's affections in Key West during the summer of 1974 – Michael Taylor, a successful, but neurotic financial advisor, and Joey Harris, a struggling, laid-back artist, former friends turned rivals over their mutual interest in the woman – are awarded joint custody of Nicole.

Each week, the mix-ups and trials of two single men raising a teenage daughter provide the stories. Judge Margaret W. Wilbur, a family court judge who gave custody of Nicole to Michael and Joey, frequently visits the new family. She bought the building in which Joey lived, so is now the live-in landlord. Michael originally has his own condo uptown, but in Episode 2, Nicole stages a sit-in at school because she feels she had no home, and the men decide it is better to all live in one home. They choose Joey's loft.

Nicole's  actual paternity is never revealed on the show, but in the episode "Pop, the Question," Michael and Joeyafter a falling outhave a DNA test to determine which of them is Nicole's biological father. The test is conducted against Nicole's wishes; she is happier not knowing who her true father is, and she destroys the results before opening them. Michael and Joey later resolve their differences and reconcile. Judge Wilbur looks at the results, but throws them away without revealing them to the audience.

The series comes to an end (in the episode called "See You in September?") when Joey reconnects with a former girlfriend named Sarah, and eventually moves to San Francisco to live with her and her daughter, Grace. He stays in contact with Nicole, Michael and Judge Wilbur, all of whom remain in New York. Nicole writes a letter to Joey, in which she makes reference to going out to San Francisco to visit, and she ends by saying that no matter what, or where he is, or who he is with, she would always be happy with him as one of her two dads.

Cast and characters

Cast

Paul Reiser as Michael Taylor
Greg Evigan as Joey Harris
Staci Keanan as Nicole Bradford
Florence Stanley as Judge Margaret W. Wilbur
Giovanni Ribisi (credited as Vonni Ribisi) as Cory Kupkus
Dick Butkus as Ed Klawicki (seasons 1 & 2)
Chad Allen as Zach Nichols (seasons 2 & 3)
Amy Hathaway as Shelby Haskell (seasons 2 & 3)

Characters
The series regularly featured Giovanni Ribisi and Chad Allen as two boys (Cory Kupkus and Zach Nichols, respectively) who competed for Nicole's affections, similar to how her two dads had done for her mother's. Florence Stanley appeared as Judge Margaret Wilbur, who was responsible for assigning Nicole's custody, and who regularly looked over the family; she was also their landlady, being the resident owner of the apartment building where the family lived. Amy Hathaway played Nicole's worldly best friend, Shelby Haskell. The cast was rounded out by former football player Dick Butkus, who managed the cafe on the building's first floor. The cafe (Klawicki's) was the second spot in the show around which a plot usually revolved; the first being the family's apartment. In the third season, when Dick Butkus left the series, the diner was then run by cook Julian (Don), but there was no explanation as to what happened to Ed Klawicki. Ownership of the diner was explained to have been taken over by Judge Wilbur at this point, and it was renamed The Judge's Court Cafe.

Night Court crossover
My Two Dads had crossovers with another NBC show, Night Court. Judge Margaret W. Wilbur, played by Florence Stanley, appeared on Night Court. In turn, Richard Moll guest starred as his Night Court character Bull Shannon in the My Two Dads episode "Playing with Fire", protecting Judge Wilbur from a recently released criminal that she had sent to prison years before.

Episodes

Broadcast
In August 1990, USA Network paid Columbia Pictures Television Distribution about $250,000 an episode, for as many as 15 runs over a three-year period, a price that was the syndication record until Major Dad surpassed that price two years later. Reruns of the show aired on the USA Network through the 1990s and again in the early 2000s.

Home media
Shout! Factory (under license from Sony Pictures Home Entertainment) has released the first two seasons of My Two Dads on DVD in Region 1.  Season 2 was released as a Shout! Factory Exclusives title, available exclusively through their online store.

Mill Creek Entertainment released a 10 episode best-of set entitled My Two Dads- You Can Count on Me on March 22, 2011. The single disc release features episodes from the first 2 seasons.

Awards

References

External links
 
 

1980s American sitcoms
1987 American television series debuts
1990s American sitcoms
1990 American television series endings
English-language television shows
Fictional trios
NBC original programming
Television series about shared parenting
Television series by Sony Pictures Television
Television series created by Michael Jacobs
Television shows set in New York City